René Klomp (Nieuwenhoorn, 16 August 1974) is a former Dutch football player.

He played for the amateurs of VV Nieuwenhoorn, to end up afterwards for the youth of Sparta Rotterdam, Feyenoord and PSV. During the season 1992-1993 he made his debut for PSV and played that season nine games for the head power. The season afterwards he was let to Sparta Rotterdam.

The two seasons afterwards he totally played ona game for PSV Eindhoven. He continued its career in Belgium. He played successively for SK Lommel, KRC Harelbeke and Eendracht Aalst. In 2002, he moved to the Cypriot competition, to play for a year at Ethnikos Achnas. He closed his career finished at the Belgian third class serum KVSK United in 2004.

References

1974 births
Living people
Dutch footballers
Dutch expatriate footballers
PSV Eindhoven players
Sparta Rotterdam players
Feyenoord players
Ethnikos Achna FC players
Cypriot First Division players
Expatriate footballers in Cyprus
People from Hellevoetsluis
K.F.C. Lommel S.K. players
K.R.C. Zuid-West-Vlaanderen players
Association footballers not categorized by position
Footballers from South Holland